Beacon Fell is a fell in the civil parish of Goosnargh in Lancashire, England. It is situated within the south westerly part of the Forest of Bowland, an Area of Outstanding Natural Beauty.

Location

From Beacon Fell there are extensive views 
 to the west, of the whole of the Fylde, including Blackpool Tower;
 to the north-west, the southern part of Morecambe Bay;
 to the north and north-east, of the Forest of Bowland hills, particularly Fair Snape Fell and Parlick;
 to the east, of Chipping, Pendle Hill, Longridge Fell and Longridge; 
 to the south, of Preston.
On a clear day the Welsh hills, the Lake District hills and the Isle of Man may be visible.

History
The high visibility of the fell made it an ideal location for a  beacon. A beacon on the fell has been recorded as early as 1002. The fell formed part of a chain of beacons to warn of the approach of the Spanish Armada in 1588, and of French forces between 1795 and 1815. More recently, beacon chains have been lit in celebration of coronations and jubilees.

In 1909, Fulwood Urban District Council bought the fell, which until then had been farmland, as a water supply. Under the provisions of the Fulwood and Whittingham Water Act of 1882, water from the fell was collected in the existing Barnsfold Reservoirs,  to the south-west, and from there piped to Fulwood and Whittingham Asylum via Horns Dam Reservoir in Goosnargh parish and a small covered reservoir in Haighton. Conifer woodland was planted on the fell to help manage drainage. From 1959, the fell was no longer required for water, and was left to fall into disrepair. The reservoirs at Barnsfold are now used for angling.

Country park

Lancashire County Council acquired the site in 1969 and opened it, in October 1970, as one in the first tranche of country parks in the United Kingdom. A new road was built connecting the existing single-track roads on the fell to form a circular route around the fell, to be operated as a one-way system. Car parks were added, and on the site of a farmhouse a visitor centre was built.

The park is popular with visitors. It has a network of well-maintained footpaths through largely coniferous woodland. The Bowland Visitor Centre provides information about the fell and the Forest of Bowland, and serves refreshments. Wildlife that may be observed on the fell includes rabbit, hare, roe deer, stoat, weasel, red fox, badger, hedgehog, mole, grey squirrel and the otter. Eleven species of dragonflies and damselflies have been found around the fell's tarn.

Charges were introduced in the car parks nearest to the visitor centre in 2011.

Art installations
The fell features a number of sculptures by local artist Thompson Dagnall, Black Tiger and Kissing Seat (2006), Walking Snake (1998), Spruced up Heron (1996) and Orme Sight (1996) however the Owl (2013) which [replaced Hanging Bat (1998)] was not carved by Thompson Dagnall.
Lancaster artist Richard Shilling is artist in residence who creates short-lasting sculptures from surrounding materials.

Cheese
Beacon Fell Traditional Lancashire Cheese, named after the Fell, and currently manufactured in Longridge and Garstang, has Protected Designation of Origin status. Only cheeses made with milk from the Fylde or the Preston area, and conforming to the published method of production, may use this name.

References

External links 
 Walking Lancashire - Country Parks

Hills of the Forest of Bowland
Parks and commons in the City of Preston
Mountains and hills of Lancashire
Country parks in Lancashire
Goosnargh